Lacunaria is a genus of flowering plants in the family Ochnaceae native to Central America and tropical South America.

Species
, Plants of the World Online accepted the following species:
Lacunaria crenata (Tul.) A.C.Sm.
Lacunaria grandiflora Ducke
Lacunaria grandifolia Ducke
Lacunaria jenmanii (Oliv.) Ducke
Lacunaria macrostachya (Tul.) A.C.Sm.
Lacunaria oppositifolia Pires
Lacunaria sampaioi Ducke
Lacunaria umbonata Pires

References

Ochnaceae
Malpighiales genera
Taxonomy articles created by Polbot
Taxa named by Adolpho Ducke